Cyanotis axillaris is a species of perennial plants in the family Commelinaceae. It is native to Indian Subcontinent, southern China, Southeast Asia and Northern Australia. It grows in monsoon forest, woodland and wooded grassland. It uses medical plant in India and it uses as food for pigs.

References

axillaris